Kileh-ye Olya (also Romanized as Kīleh-ye ‘Olyā; also known as Gīleh-ye ‘Olyā, Kileh, and Kīleh-ye Bālā) is a village in Lahijan-e Sharqi Rural District, Lajan District, Piranshahr County, West Azerbaijan Province, Iran. At the 2006 census, its population was 279, in 55 families.

References 

Populated places in Piranshahr County